Lewis James Payne (born 11 July 2004) is an English professional footballer who plays as a right-back for Eastleigh on loan from Southampton.

Career
Payne signed his first professional contract with Southampton in November 2021. On 23 August 2022, he made his professional debut in the 3–0 win over Cambridge United in the EFL Cup, providing the assist for the first goal.

On 31 January 2023, Payne signed for National League club Eastleigh until the end of the season.

Career statistics

Notes

References

2004 births
Living people
English footballers
Association football defenders
Southampton F.C. players
Eastleigh F.C. players
National League (English football) players